A Glimpse of Hell may refer to:
A Glimpse of Hell (book), an investigative journalism book by Charles C. Thompson II about the USS Iowa turret explosion
A Glimpse of Hell (film), a film directed by Mikael Salomon based on Thompson's book